Durga Sagar, known locally as Madhabpasha Dighi, is the largest lake in southern Bangladesh. Rani Durgabati, mother of Raja Joy Narayan, had the pond excavated in 1780. There is a small island in the middle of the lake; this island was originally not part of the lake – it was created artificially to beautify and increase tourist attraction.

Transportation 
Tourists can go there by road, including by bus, from Barisal City.

References 

Lakes of Bangladesh
Barishal Division
Tourist attractions in Barisal